Steinberger is a series of electric guitars and bass guitars.

Steinberger may also refer to:

Steinberger (surname)
Steinberger, the term used on labels for wine from the vineyard Steinberg, Kloster Eberbach Rheingau
Steinberger See, lake in Bavaria, Germany